Maryanne Trump Barry (born April 5, 1937) is an American attorney and a retired United States federal judge. She became an Assistant United States Attorney in 1974, and was first appointed to the United States District Court for the District of New Jersey by President Ronald Reagan in 1983. In 1999, she was appointed to the United States Court of Appeals for the Third Circuit (Philadelphia, PA) by President Bill Clinton.

In January 2006, she testified before the Senate Judiciary Committee in support of the nomination of her colleague Samuel Alito to the United States Supreme Court. She took senior status in June 2011 and in February 2019 she announced her retirement from the bench after an investigation was launched into allegations that she committed judicial misconduct by participating in fraudulent tax and financial transactions. 

Former U.S. President Donald Trump is Barry's younger brother.

Early life and education
Barry was born Maryanne Trump in Queens in New York City on April 5, 1937, the eldest child of real-estate developer Fred Trump and Mary Anne MacLeod Trump. She is an elder sister of Donald Trump, 45th President of the United States. She attended Kew-Forest School. She graduated cum laude with a Bachelor of Arts degree from Mount Holyoke College in 1958, and a Master of Arts in public law and government from Columbia University in 1962. She later attended law school, earning her Juris Doctor from Hofstra University School of Law in 1974.

Career

U.S. Attorney's Office 
After being a homemaker for thirteen years, in 1974 Barry became an Assistant United States Attorney, one of only two women out of sixty-two lawyers in the office of the United States Attorney for the District of New Jersey. She was in the civil division from 1974 to 1975 and in the appeals division from 1976 to 1982, serving as deputy chief of that division from 1976 to 1977 and chief of the division from 1977 to 1982. She served as Executive Assistant United States Attorney from 1981 to 1982. She was First Assistant United States Attorney from 1981 to 1983.

U.S. District Court
Barry was nominated by President Ronald Reagan on September 14, 1983, to a seat on the United States District Court for the District of New Jersey vacated by Henry Curtis Meanor. She was confirmed by the United States Senate on October 6, 1983, and received her commission the next day.

In 1985, she recused herself in a drug-trafficking case due to her brother Donald's relationship with the accused trafficker. Her service in the district court ended on October 25, 1999, when she was elevated to the Third Circuit Court of Appeals.

Barry's reputation on the bench was that of a tough judge with strong command of her courtroom. In 1989, while a district court judge in Newark, New Jersey, she disapproved a plea bargain that would have freed two county detectives accused of protecting a drug dealer, and forced the case to trial. The detectives were convicted and received jail terms. She also presided over the conviction of Louis Manna, the Genovese crime family mobster accused of plotting to assassinate rival John Gotti.

U.S. Court of Appeals 

A Republican, Barry was nominated to serve on the United States Court of Appeals for the Third Circuit by Democratic President Bill Clinton on June 17, 1999. She was nominated to fill the vacancy created when H. Lee Sarokin retired in 1996. (Clinton had nominated Robert Raymar to the seat in 1998, but that nomination had expired at the end of the year without being given a hearing by the Senate Judiciary Committee.)

The Senate unanimously confirmed Barry on September 13, 1999. She received her commission on September 22, 1999. "I am deeply honored and very grateful for the nomination," Barry told the New Jersey Law Journal in 1999. "I am surprised I was approached on it. I assume that my record is good enough as a district court judge to be reached out to, and I'm glad that politics weren't a priority here."

In January 2006, Barry testified in support of the appointment of fellow Third Circuit Judge Samuel Alito to the Supreme Court.

In a 2006 ruling, Abou Cham v. Attorney General, Barry was harshly critical of the conduct of a U.S. Immigration Court judge in a case involving a refugee from The Gambia. The refugee petitioner was the nephew of former Gambian president Dawda Jawara, who had been deposed in a coup in 1994; the new regime had imprisoned or killed several of Cham's relatives, and outlawed their political party. Barry ruled in favor of Abou Cham; criticized Judge Donald Ferlise's questioning over a two-day hearing as bullying, belligerent, and abusive toward "an increasingly distraught petitioner"; and concluding that Cham had been "ground to bits" emotionally. Barry wrote that there was "not a modicum of courtesy, of respect or of any pretense of fairness" in Ferlise's treatment of Cham, which led Ferlise to conclude that Cham's testimony was not credible, and concluded that the Immigration Court's ruling was a "severe wound" on the American justice system. Ferlise was relieved of his duties shortly after Barry's decision.

On June 30, 2011, Barry assumed senior status. She took inactive senior status in the first week of February 2017, about two weeks after her brother's inauguration as president.

Barry retired on February 11, 2019. Her retirement brought an end to an investigation of whether she had engaged in fraudulent tax schemes with her siblings that violated judicial conduct rules. The investigation closed without reaching a conclusion about the allegations.

Allegations of tax evasion
In October 2018, The New York Times published an investigative report asserting that Barry, along with her father and siblings, had engaged in fraudulent and illegal activity for the purpose of limiting estate tax and gift tax liability stemming from Fred Trump's real estate enterprises. Investigative journalist Susanne Craig discovered a filing Barry had made to the Senate as part of her federal judiciary confirmation in 1983, in which she had reported a $1 million contribution from All County Building Supply & Maintenance. The Times reported that All County Building Supply & Maintenance was a "sham company" formed in 1992 and owned by Barry, Donald Trump, their siblings, and a cousin.

All County Building Supply & Maintenance reportedly paid for work performed at Fred Trump's apartment buildings; those apartment buildings then reimbursed the company, but fraudulently added extra money to those reimbursements. Tax experts reportedly indicated that because All County "performed no real work, the transfer of money through the corporation was essentially a gift that evaded the 55 percent tax in place at the time". Its address was the Manhasset, New York, residence of John Walter, Fred Trump's nephew. In a follow-up article, The New York Times reported that the money illicitly earned by All County was split by the Trump siblings.

In October 2018, as a result of the publication of this investigation, the New York State Department of Taxation and Finance began a review of the fraud allegations against Barry and her siblings.

On February 1, 2019, four legal professionals who had filed complaints against Judge Barry in October 2018 stemming from the allegations made in The New York Times were notified by the Court of Appeals for the Second Circuit that an investigation into judicial misconduct by Barry had been launched, in regard to her alleged participation in fraudulent tax and financial transactions. Ten days later, Barry, a senior inactive judge at the time, announced her retirement from the bench, effectively ending the investigation.

Criticism of Donald Trump
Barry said little publicly about her brother during his presidency. In August 2020, Barry's niece, Mary L. Trump, revealed that she had surreptitiously audio-recorded 15 hours of discussions with Barry in 2018 and 2019. In those recorded discussions, Barry sharply criticized the president. Mary Trump publicly released a number of transcripts and audio excerpts of the conversations, including content that did not previously appear in Mary Trump's book published in July 2020, Too Much and Never Enough: How My Family Created the World's Most Dangerous Man.

In the recordings, Barry said of her brother: "All he wants to do is appeal to his base. He has no principles. None. His goddamned tweeting and lying... oh my God. I'm talking too freely, but you know. The change of stories. The lack of preparation. The lying. Holy shit." She added that her brother does not read books and had someone take the college entrance exam in his place. She said, "It's the phoniness of it all. It's the phoniness and this cruelty. Donald is cruel." In the recordings, Barry also criticized the Trump administration family separation policy and previous bankruptcies of Trump's businesses, adding, "You can’t trust him."

Awards
In 2004, Supreme Court Justice Sandra Day O'Connor presented Barry with an award, named for O'Connor, that the Seton Hall University School of Law gives to women who excel in law and public service. At the presentation ceremony, Barry said, "I say to the women out there, remember how difficult it was for women like Justice O'Connor starting out," adding, "Even though she graduated with top grades, she had to take a job as a legal secretary. Remember how far we have come."

Personal life
Barry's first husband was David Desmond; the couple divorced in 1980. In 1982, she married John Joseph Barry, a New Jersey lawyer. They were married 18 years before he died on April 9, 2000. She has one son from her first marriage, David William Desmond, who is a New York psychologist.

In 2016, Barry gave $4 million to Fairfield University, a Catholic institution, to fund scholarships and endow the university's Center for Ignatian Spirituality.

Notes

References

External links

 

1937 births
Living people
20th-century American judges
20th-century American lawyers
21st-century American judges
American people of German descent
American people of Scottish descent
Assistant United States Attorneys
Columbia University alumni
Hofstra University alumni
Maurice A. Deane School of Law alumni
Judges of the United States Court of Appeals for the Third Circuit
Judges of the United States District Court for the District of New Jersey
Lawyers from New York City
Lawyers from Philadelphia
Mount Holyoke College alumni
New York (state) Republicans
People from Jamaica Estates, Queens
Pennsylvania Republicans
Trump family
United States court of appeals judges appointed by Bill Clinton
United States district court judges appointed by Ronald Reagan
Donald Trump
20th-century American women lawyers
20th-century American women judges
21st-century American women judges
Fairfield University people